Scylax of Caryanda was a Greek explorer and writer of the late 6th and early 5th centuries BCE. His own writings are lost, though occasionally cited or quoted by later Greek and Roman authors. The periplus sometimes called the Periplus of Scylax is not, in fact, by him; that so-called Periplus of Pseudo-Scylax was written in about the early 330s BCE by an unknown author working in the ambit of the post-Platonic Academy and/or the Aristotelian Peripatos (Lyceum) at Athens.

Exploration

Scylax was from Caryanda, a small city on an island close to Iasos in Asia Minor. He was probably an ethnic Carian, who might have been familiar with Greek and used it for his writings. Not much is known about Scylax, except for the few fragments of information relayed by later Greek writers. Herodotus calls him a sea-captain from Ionia. He is said to have sailed down the Indus River at the behest of the Achaemenid emperor Darius I (522–486 BCE) and then around the Arabian peninsula to reach Suez. In the narrative of Herodotus:

Several questions have been raised about this narrative. The city of Caspatyrus and the country of Pactyica have not been traced to any real locations. Assuming that it is somewhere in the vicinity of Gandhara, which was under the control of the Achaemenid emperor, it is unclear how Scylax was able to assemble a fleet of vessels in this land-locked country. More importantly, the Indus does not flow east, but rather in a south-westerly direction. Due to these reasons, some commentators doubted if Scylax's journey ever took place. But these doubts are now laid to rest by the excavations at Suez, which seem to corroborate Scylax's account, and Darius's subsequent acquisition of control over Sindh.

Scholars have constructed various explanations for these questions. David Bivar has noted that 'Caspatyrus' was written as 'Caspapyrus' by the later Greek writer Hekataios, and both the names seem to have been misspellings of 'Paskapyrus', a known Greek spelling of the name of Peshawar. Scylax is presumed to have started by sailing east along the Kabul River and turned south after its confluence with the Indus River near Attock. The idea that the Indus itself flowed east must have been a misunderstanding by Herodotus or his source.

Scholars state that Scylax's expedition was not merely for exploration, but rather for reconnaissance for future conquest by Darius. According to Matthew R. Christ and Grant Parker, "Herodotus presents geographical curiosity as a feature of foreign kings, particularly when they plan conquest". Olmstead characterised it as a "spying" expedition. It lasted thirty months. Soon afterwards, Darius seems to have added to his empire the lands explored by Scylax as a new province called Hinduš. It was referred to as "India" by the Greek writers. The extent of the province is not precisely known, though Herodotus's description of it as lying to the west of the desert (Thar desert) limits it to essentially Sindh (middle and lower Indus basin).

Darius also commissioned the completion of the canal connecting the Nile with the Red Sea, stating in an inscription:

Afterwards, oceanic communication between India and Persia as well as Egypt and Mediterranean were established and maintained for some time.

Works
Scylax wrote an account of his travels, perhaps entitled Periplus (Circumnavigation) and said to have been dedicated to Darius. The work has disappeared except for seven quotations by later writers. The surviving quotations indicate it was not merely a logbook, but contained accounts of people, landscape, the natural conditions and perhaps also political affairs. Scholar Klaus Karttunen believes that it might have been written in Greek, in which case it would have been among the first works to be written in Greek prose. Hekataios was influenced by the work and Herodotus knew about it, though he may not have actually seen it himself.

The surviving quotations appear fabulous. One talks about Troglodytes (cave-dwellers), another about Monophthalmic (one-eyed people), yet another about Henotiktontes (people that produce only one offspring). According to Tzetzes, Scylax claimed that all these things were true and not made up. Scholar R. D. Milns states that Scylax would have reported the stories he heard from the natives, which he would have accepted in good faith.

Scylax's Periplus provided the West with its first account of the easterly people and served as a model for later Greek writers. More lastingly, it gave India its name. The people of the Indus region were referred to as Hiduš or Hindush in Persian (due to sound change of *s > h from Proto-Iranian Sindhu). If Scylax wrote in the Ionic dialect of Greek, which did not pronounce initial h sounds, he would have transformed it to Indos (plural: Indoi). Their land was characterised as Indike (the adjectival form, meaning "Indian"). Herodotus uses these terms as equivalent to the Persian terms Hiduš and Hindush, even though he also generalised them to all the people living east of Persia, leading to considerable ambiguities.

Scylax was famous in the ancient world. He is mentioned by Strabo as an "ancient writer."  According to the Suda, he also wrote (perhaps "in the decades around 480 BC") a life of his contemporary, Heraclides of Mylasa (τὰ κατὰ Ἡρακλείδην τὸν Μυλασσῶν βασιλέα), who is mentioned in Herodotus 5.121.

In popular culture
In the historical fiction novel Creation by Gore Vidal Scylax of Caryanda appears as a character who is on such familiar terms with King Darius I of Persia that they engage in humorous banter about extending Persian rule to India.

See also
 List of explorers

Notes

References

Sources

Ancient sources 
 Herodotus, Histories, 4.44
 Aristotle, Politics, 7.13.2
 Suda, s.v. Σκύλαξ

External links
 Dictionary of Greek and Roman Biography and Mythology 
 

6th-century BC births
5th-century BC deaths
Ancient Greek explorers
Ancient Greek geographers
Ancient Greek biographers
Ancient Greeks in Caria
Explorers of Asia
Explorers of India
Peripluses
6th-century BC geographers
5th-century BC geographers